Springfield is a city in Sarpy County, Nebraska, United States. The population was 1,529 at the 2010 census.

History
Springfield was platted in 1873 by a U.S. Civil War veteran named J. D. Spearman. This was done in anticipation of the coming of the Missouri Pacific Railroad. The town was named from several springs nearby.

Geography
Springfield is located at  (41.082245, -96.132431).

The nearest hospital is Midlands Hospital (9.1 miles distant), located in Papillion. Papillion is also the location of the county courthouse.

Demographics

2010 census
As of the census of 2010, there were 1,529 people, 575 households, and 423 families living in the city. The racial makeup of the city was 95.8% White, 0.7% African American, 0.1% Native American, 0.2% Asian, 0.5% from other races, and 2.7% from two or more races. Hispanic or Latino of any race were 1.8% of the population.

There were 575 households, of which 37.6% had children under the age of 18 living with them, 56.2% were married couples living together, 11.7% had a female householder with no husband present, 5.7% had a male householder with no wife present, and 26.4% were non-families. 21.9% of all households were made up of individuals, and 8.6% had someone living alone who was 65 years of age or older. The average household size was 2.66 and the average family size was 3.12.

The median age in the city was 37.3 years. 27.7% of residents were under the age of 18; 8.1% were between the ages of 18 and 24; 23.5% were from 25 to 44; 29.5% were from 45 to 64; and 11.2% were 65 years of age or older. The gender makeup of the city was 51.4% male and 48.6% female.

2000 census
As of the census of 2000, there were 1,450 people, 529 households, and 405 families living in the city. The population density was 2,655.2 people per square mile (1,017.9/km). There were 544 housing units at an average density of 996.1 per square mile (381.9/km). The racial makeup of the city was 98.69% White, 0.21% African American, 0.21% Asian, 0.14% from other races, and 0.76% from two or more races. Hispanic or Latino of any race were 1.45% of the population.

There were 529 households, out of which 38.2% had children under the age of 18 living with them, 64.5% were married couples living together, 9.5% had a female householder with no husband present, and 23.4% were non-families. 19.7% of all households were made up of individuals, and 7.8% had someone living alone who was 65 years of age or older. The average household size was 2.74 and the average family size was 3.16.

In the city, the population was spread out, with 27.6% under the age of 18, 10.1% from 18 to 24, 28.6% from 25 to 44, 23.8% from 45 to 64, and 9.9% who were 65 years of age or older. The median age was 36 years. For every 100 females, there were 94.9 males. For every 100 females age 18 and over, there were 91.6 males.

As of 2000 the median income for a household in the city was $48,083, and the median income for a family was $54,236. Males had a median income of $36,193 versus $23,950 for females. The per capita income for the city was $19,573. About 1.9% of families and 2.6% of the population were below the poverty line, including 3.1% of those under age 18 and 4.8% of those age 65 or over.

Attractions
Springfield is the site of the Sarpy County fair held every August. The MoPac Trail runs from Springfield south to the Platte River.  This trail will connect Omaha to Lincoln upon completion.

In popular culture
The music video for "You and I" by Lady Gaga was filmed in Springfield between July 21–24, 2011.

References

External links
 City website
 "Springfield" at Nebraska... Our Towns.

Cities in Nebraska
Cities in Sarpy County, Nebraska
Populated places established in 1873